Rasm al-Harmal al-Imam is a town in northern Syria, administratively part of the Dayr Hafir District of the Aleppo Governorate, located 50 east of Aleppo. Nearby localities include Rasm al-Krum to the southwest, Dayr Hafir to the south and Rasm Kabar to the southeast.

Economy 
The economy of the town depends on agriculture, trade, services.

Education 
There are two elementary schools, one intermediate (junior-high) school, and one secondary (high) school.

Health 
The town is provided with a public health clinic. Also there are some specialized private clinics and pharmacies.

References

Populated places in Dayr Hafir District
Towns in Syria